Sirodotia huillensis (Welwitsch ex West & G.S.West) Skuja is a freshwater red algal species belonging to the family Batrachospermaceae. This species mostly reported from high altitude forest streams.

Taxonomic description 
Plant height ranges from 6–10 cm, thallus moderately mucilaginous, abundantly branched, branches arise from the internodes; a few grows like main axis and others remaining short, giving a false appearance of sparse branching.  Colour of the gametophyte varies from light green to olive green. Primary and secondary fascicles (whorls) are produced all along the plant body which gives beaded appearance to the thallus.  The inter-nodal region has secondary fascicles which are globular when young and obconical (cone) at maturity.  The whorls are 280.50 – 540.10 µm in diameter and 210.85 to 764.95 µm long.

Plant is both diecious and monoecious. Spermatangia are produced in separate male plants on both primary and secondary laterals, apical or sub apical in position which are either single or in clusters, pairs are also common. First carpogonial branch arises at 15–30th axial cells, 1–2 per basal cell, 3–5 cell long, slightly curved with distinctly stalked cylindrical trichogyne on the dorsal side of asymmetrical carpogonium. Carpogonium slightly protruded or broader on ventral side and 7.50 to 12.85 µm in diameter, trichogyne cylindrical elongated with wavy margin.

The initiation of Gonimoblast filament starts from the ventral side of Carpogonium. Gonimoblast filaments creeping along the cortical filaments and producing 2 - 4 celled branches, which forms carposporangium.

Distribution 
This alga is strictly a freshwater algae and known as cold water algae, because it always grow in high altitude stream where the water temperature is always low.

Temperate and tropical Countries.

From India Maharashtra, Karnataka and from Orissa

References

Batrachospermales